Cylindrocladiella is a genus of ascomycete fungi in the family Nectriaceae. There are 11 species.

Species
Cylindrocladiella brevicollis
Cylindrocladiella camelliae
Cylindrocladiella elegans
Cylindrocladiella infestans
Cylindrocladiella lageniformis
Cylindrocladiella mangiferae
Cylindrocladiella microcylindrica
Cylindrocladiella novae-zelandiae
Cylindrocladiella parva
Cylindrocladiella tenuis
Cylindrocladiella viticola

External links
 

Nectriaceae
Nectriaceae genera